James Fahey may refer to:

James Charles Fahey (1903–1974), American author
James Fahey (painter) (1804–1885), English landscape painter
Jim Fahey (born 1979), American ice hockey player